Panchavadi is a 1973 Indian Malayalam film, directed by J. Sasikumar and produced by VM Chandi. The film stars Prem Nazir, Vijayasree, Adoor Bhasi, Jose Prakash and T. S. Muthaiah in lead roles. The film had musical score by M. K. Arjunan.

Cast

Prem Nazir as Sathish
Vijayasree as Nalini
Adoor Bhasi as Sadhashivam
Jose Prakash as Aspashtananda Sawami
T. S. Muthaiah as Nalini's Father
Bahadoor as Kesavan Pilla
K. P. Ummer as Sabu
Meena as Visalam 
Paravoor Bharathan as Kumar
Rajakokila as Malini
Sadhana as Leela 
Vincent as Chandran
Saroja as Emily
Kunchan as Constable

Soundtrack
The music was composed by M. K. Arjunan and lyrics was written by Sreekumaran Thampi.

References

External links
 

1973 films
1970s Malayalam-language films
Films directed by J. Sasikumar